Leucaena pueblana is a species of plant in the family Fabaceae. It is found only in Mexico. It is threatened by habitat loss.

References

pueblana
Flora of Mexico
Vulnerable plants
Taxonomy articles created by Polbot